Alison Lynne Fields (born August 1, 1979) is an American art historian and educator. Fields is currently the Mary Lou Milner Carver Professor of Art of the American West at University of Oklahoma.

Career
Fields received a Bachelor of Arts in English and Native American Studies from Colgate University in 2001. There, she was part of the Student Government Association. Fields then proceeded to receive a Master of Arts in American Civilization from Brown University in 2003, and a Doctor of Philosophy in American Studies from the University of New Mexico in 2009. Fields wrote a doctoral dissertation titled "False Closure: Narratives of Trauma, Healing, and American Nationhood." Following graduating, she was hired as the Mary Lou Milner Carver Professor of Art of the American West at University of Oklahoma. Additionally, Fields began serving as Associate Editor of the journal titled Western Historical Quarterly since 2016, and two years later, Associate Director of the School of Visual Arts.

See also
List of Brown University alumni
List of Colgate University people
List of University of New Mexico alumni
List of University of Oklahoma people

References

External links
University of Oklahoma profile
Chickasaw Press profile

1979 births
Living people
Colgate University alumni
Brown University alumni
University of New Mexico alumni
University of Oklahoma faculty
American art historians
Women art historians